The 1995–96 FIBA European Cup was the thirtieth edition of FIBA's 2nd-tier level European-wide professional club basketball competition. it occurred between September 5, 1995, and March 12, 1996. The final was held at Araba Arena, Vitoria, Spain. In the final, Taugrés defeated PAOK, in front of 5,500 spectators.

Team allocation 
The labels in the parentheses show how each team qualified for the place of its starting round:

 CW: Cup winners
 CF: Cup finalist

 1st, 2nd, 3rd, 4th, 5th, etc.: League position after eventual Playoffs

First round

|}

Second round

|}

Third round
Wild card to participate in the European Cup for the Loser clubs* of the 1/16 finals of the 1995–96 FIBA European League.
*Partizan, Hapoel Galil Elyon, Sheffield Sharks, Sunair Oostende, Zrinjevac, Baník Cígeľ Prievidza, Smelt Olimpija, Budivelnyk, Kalev, Fidefinanz Bellinzona, Sibiu, APOEL and Žalgiris.

|}

Quarterfinals group stage

Semifinals
Seeded teams played games 2 and 3 at home.

|}

Final
March 12, Pabellon Araba, Vitoria-Gasteiz

|}

Awards

FIBA Saporta Cup Finals MVP 
 Ramón Rivas ( Taugrés)

References

External links
1995–96 FIBA European Cup @ FIBA Europe.com
1995–96 FIBA European Cup at Linguasport

FIBA
1995-96